Vadim Dzmitryevich Zhuk (born 20 May 1952) is a former Soviet association football referee from Belarus.

Zhuk refereed the final match of 1991 Women's World Cup and the 1996 UEFA Cup Final between Bordeaux and Bayern München. He also worked at UEFA Euro 1996.

Zhuk was placed eighth on the IFFHS' World's Best Referee of the Year in 1995.

References

1952 births
Living people
Belarusian football referees
FIFA Women's World Cup referees
Soviet football referees
UEFA Champions League referees
UEFA Euro 1996 referees
FIFA Women's World Cup Final match officials